The Xbox Music Mixer is a multimedia accessory/utility developed by Wild Tangent and published by Microsoft Game Studios for the Xbox. The Xbox Music Mixer was released on December 1, 2003. The Xbox Music Mixer allows one to transfer certain types of music and pictures directly from a PC to the Xbox, though this requires a separate install on the computer. The Xbox Music Mixer also allows one to view photos on a TV set and create customized soundtracks to go with the photo slideshow.

Features
The Xbox Music Mixer has several features that enhance the Xbox's multimedia capabilities:
 Microphone support
 View photos
 Custom Soundtracks
 2D & 3D visualizations
 On-screen lyrics
 Voice stripping
 Karaoke recording
 Interactive Media Player
 Voice Recording
 Downloadable Content via Xbox Live internet channel
 Xbox Live Voice
 Custom Visualizations
 Interactive Visualizations
 Listen to music
 Transfers music and photos from computer (requires Ethernet connection)
 Xbox Key allows you to download more songs from the internet
 Xbox Live Aware
 Xbox Exclusive

Accessories
The Xbox Music Mixer''' comes with a few accessories like the microphone.

 Karaoke Microphone, lets you sing with the songs you play or create.
 Xbox Key, lets you create an account for Xbox Karaoke.
 Microphone to Xbox converter (lets you use microphones on the Xbox)

Current statusXbox Music Mixer, as with all products for the original Xbox, is out of print. Additionally, as Xbox Live support for the original Xbox ceased in 2010, any features dependent on Xbox Live are no longer operable.

While Microsoft no longer produces Xbox Music Mixer, they still host screen shots, trailers, and downloads regarding Xbox Music Mixer. Microsoft still allows you to download the Xbox Music Mixer PC Tool'' for your computer which allows you transfer music and photo contents to the Xbox. citations needed (note: each transfer to the Xbox requires an Ethernet bridge between the Xbox and your computer).

References
 Xbox Music Mixer at Xbox.com (September 24, 2007)
 IGN IGN: Xbox Music Mixer at IGN.com (September 25, 2007)
 GameSpy GameSpy: Xbox Music Mixer at GameSpy.com (September 25, 2007)
 Team Xbox Xbox Music Mixer (Xbox) at games.teamxbox.com (September 25, 2007)

External links
 Official Xbox Music Mixer game detail page
 Official Xbox Karaoke Songs Download Site
 IGN: Xbox Music Mixer
 GameSpy: Xbox Music Mixer
 Xbox Music Mixer

2003 video games
Karaoke video games
Music video games
Video games developed in the United States
Xbox games
Xbox-only games